The Fanji language, Chuufiè (chufieʼ), is a Grassfields Bantu language and the language of the Bafanji people in the Northwest Region of Cameroon. There are approximately 17,000 speakers. The language has a rich system of tonal morphology, including reduplication involving adjectives.

Bafanji speakers, who number 8,500, call their language Chuufi. It is spoken south of Ndop in Ngoketunjia Department, Northwest Region. It is closely related to Bamali, Mengambo, and Bambalang.

Phonology

Consonants

References

Languages of Cameroon
Nun languages